"Feels So Good" is a song by British recording artist Melanie B. It was written along with Jimmy Jam and Terry Lewis for her debut solo album Hot (2001) and released as the album's second single on 19 February 2001. In the United Kingdom, it debuted and peaked at number five, becoming the 85th-best-selling single of 2001. As of June 2017, it has sold 142,000 copies in the UK. The sleeve was designed by Ian Ross for Bill Smith Studio with photography by Dean Freeman.

Music video
The video starts out with Brown driving her car down a road singing the intro and scenes of a house with a couple kissing. The first chorus starts as Brown gets out of her car. As the song progresses, she walks through the house singing the song with scenes of three couples kissing and then an unseen blinding light appears and the woman in each couple knock something over (e.i. a glass of wine, a bowl of doughnuts, a beer bottle). The video ends with Brown and her boyfriend kissing on a bed and a bright light flashing. The video was shot and directed by Martin Weisz in November 2000. According to Brown, the video was originally scheduled to be shot in the Mojave Desert, which was where the album photoshoots were taken, but the idea was scrapped due to a heavy amount of rain.

Track listings

 UK and European enhanced CD single
 "Feels So Good"  – 4:01
 "Feels So Good"  – 4:07
 "Feels So Good"  – 5:22
 "Feels So Good"  – 4:00

 UK cassette single
 "Feels So Good"  – 4:01
 "Feels So Good"  – 4:07
 "Feels So Good"  – 5:22

 UK 12-inch single
A1. "Feels So Good"  – 5:22
A2. "Feels So Good" – 5:05
B1. "Feels So Good"  – 7:33

 European CD single
 "Feels So Good"  – 4:01
 "Feels So Good"  – 4:07

 Australasian CD single
 "Feels So Good"  – 4:01
 "Feels So Good"  – 7:36
 "Tell Me"  – 6:06
 "Feels So Good"  – 5:24
 "I Want You Back"  – 8:22
 "Feels So Good"  – 4:00

Charts and sales

Weekly charts

Year-end charts

Sales

|}

References

2000 songs
2001 singles
Mel B songs
Music videos directed by Martin Weisz
Song recordings produced by Jimmy Jam and Terry Lewis
Songs written by Jimmy Jam and Terry Lewis
Songs written by Mel B
Virgin Records singles